A Commonwealth XI cricket team visited Pakistan from February to April 1968 and played eight first-class matches including three four-day matches against Pakistan. The Commonwealth XI won three matches and lost two, with the other three matches ending in draws. Pakistan won the four-day series with a victory in the opening games followed by two draws.

Captained by Richie Benaud, the Commonwealth team consisted of Roger Prideaux, Mushtaq Mohammad, Tony Lewis, Don Shepherd, Peter Walker, John Murray, David Allen, Mike Edwards, Brian Luckhurst, John Hampshire, Peter Marner, Ken Shuttleworth and Keith Boyce. Benaud was not available for the early matches and Prideaux, as vice-captain, and Lewis deputised for him.

References

1968 in Pakistani cricket
Multi-national cricket tours of Pakistan
Pakistani cricket seasons from 1947–48 to 1969–70
International cricket competitions from 1960–61 to 1970